In enzymology, an octanol dehydrogenase is an enzyme that catalyzes the chemical reaction

1-octanol + NAD+  1-octanal + NADH + H+

Thus, the two substrates of this enzyme are 1-octanol and NAD+, whereas its 3 products are 1-octanal, NADH, and H+.

This enzyme belongs to the family of oxidoreductases, specifically those acting on the CH-OH group of donor with NAD+ or NADP+ as acceptor. The systematic name of this enzyme class is octanol:NAD+ oxidoreductase. This enzyme is also called 1-octanol dehydrogenase.

References

 

EC 1.1.1
NADH-dependent enzymes
Enzymes of unknown structure